The men's 100 metre backstroke event at the 2004 Olympic Games was contested at the Olympic Aquatic Centre of the Athens Olympic Sports Complex in Athens, Greece on August 15 and 16.

U.S. swimmer Aaron Peirsol won a gold medal in this event, outside an Olympic record time of 54.06 seconds. Markus Rogan captured Austria's first ever medal in swimming after a hundred years, earning the silver at 54.35. Japan's Tomomi Morita, on the other hand, edged out defending Olympic champion and world record holder Lenny Krayzelburg to take a bronze by two hundredths of a second (0.02), breaking an Asian record time of 54.36 seconds.

Records
Prior to this competition, the existing world and Olympic records were as follows:

Results

Heats

Semifinals

Semifinal 1

Semifinal 2

Final

References

External links
Official Olympic Report

M
Men's events at the 2004 Summer Olympics